Mark Wood FRGS (born 1966), is a British explorer, professional speaker, expedition leader, and author. He served in the British Army in the Second Battalion, Royal Regiment of Fusiliers, and as a firefighter in the Royal Berkshire Fire and Rescue Service. He subsequently became an explorer, and expedition leader where he has trained and led teams for major  Polar and mountain expeditions in extreme environments such as the Arctic Circle, the Himalayas, Antarctica, Alaska, and the Canadian and Norwegian High Arctic to raise awareness of  climate change and creates very large virtual classrooms to talk to schools and children about these issues.

Early life and education
Mark was born in Coventry and attended two local schools: Stivichall Primary School and Coventry Finham Park School.

Military
Mark served in the British Army in the Second Battalion, of the Royal Regiment of Fusiliers, UK. He was in the military for a number of years and was awarded the Queen Elizabeth II Golden Jubilee Medal.

Firefighter
Once he left the military he became a firefighter in the Royal Berkshire Fire and Rescue Service.

Expeditions and exploration 
As an expedition leader and an  explorer he has since 2003 been to various  Polar regions ranging from reaching the Magnetic North Pole, the Geomagnetic North Pole twice, and solo expeditions to both the Geographic North Pole and the South Pole. He has worked with the BBC and Channel 5 on various documentaries, having trained teams of people to undertake expeditions, and led expeditions in the extremes of the planet. His documentaries range from: the life of dog teams in Alaska, surviving solo in the Polar extremes, the reality of global warming and its effect on the Arctic Ocean en route to the North Pole.
 More recently the aim of his expedition is to explain, to children in their classrooms, using the medium of Skype combined with film and sound, during his expeditions, the effects of global warming in the Polar regions where the effects of climate change and global warming are clearly evident. As all of his expeditions are connected with climate change and to empower the younger generations he works with The Prince's Trust, he is a scout leader for the 1st Pillerton Scout Group, a patron of the Children's University, an explorer for IGGY.

Positions and awards
 Chair of the Great Britain and Ireland Chapter, The Explorers Club
 Member of The Explorers Club, Norwegian Chapter
 Royal Geographical Society Fellowship of the Royal Geographical Society, London, England
 Explorer for IGGY
 Polar Explorer for Warwick University
 Ambassador of The Prince's Trust
 Scout Ambassador to 1st Pillerton Scout Group
 The Peoples Moon Ambassador – Apollo 50th anniversary
 Ambassador to Sporting Equals
 Patron of Children's University
 Patron of Patron for Hire A Hero

Selected publications

References

External links 
 
 
 
 
 

1966 births
Living people
People from Coventry
Explorers of the Arctic
21st-century explorers
British polar explorers
Royal Regiment of Fusiliers soldiers